Tommy Ed Roberts (October 19, 1940 – March 1, 2014) was an American politician and businessman.

From Hartselle, Alabama, he graduated from Hartselle High School. Roberts served in the United States Army Reserve and the Alabama National Guard. He attended Jacksonville State University, Rochester Institute of Technology, and University of Oklahoma. He owned a men's clothing store in Decatur, Alabama and was President and CEO of the Morgan County Economic Development Association. In 1974, he began serving in the Alabama House of Representatives, and then in 1994, he moved to the Alabama State Senate. He died in Hartselle, Alabama in 2014.

References

1940 births
2014 deaths
People from Hartselle, Alabama
People from Morgan County, Alabama
Jacksonville State University alumni
Rochester Institute of Technology alumni
University of Oklahoma alumni
Businesspeople from Alabama
Members of the Alabama House of Representatives
Alabama state senators
20th-century American businesspeople